Palsana is a Town located in the Sikar District region of Rajasthan state in India. It is 84 km away from Jaipur, 350 km from Jodhpur 245 km from Bikaner and 250 km from Delhi.

Geography and Climate

Geography
Palsana is the Panchayat Samiti of Dantaramgarh Tahsil of Sikar district which is situated in the eastern part of Rajasthan. It has an average elevation of 427 metres (1401 feet).

Climate
Palsana has a hot semi-arid climate (Köppen climate classification BSh) climate, rains occur in the monsoon months between June and September. During the monsoon there are frequent, heavy rains and thunderstorms, but flooding is not common. There are however occasional cold fronts that lead to temperatures near freezing.

Place of Interest
 SURAJ Smart School, Palsana
 Sri Digamber Jain Bada Mandir, Bawari Gate
 Shakambhari Mata Hills and Temple
 Khandela Vaishya Dham
 Madho Niwas Kothi
 Diwan Ji ki Haveli
 Shobhagyavati mandir
 Saras Dairy
 Mata Mansa Devi Temple, Hasampur
 Desi Tatt Bhojnalay,

Administration
Palsana city is governed by Municipal Corporation which comes under Sikar Rural Agglomeration.

Transport

Rail
Palsana comes under the territory of Northern Western Railway, and is served by Palsana railway station. As of now Palsana city is well connected through broad gauge railway line section to, Jaipur, Loharu, Rewari, Churu, Jhunjhunu.

Road
Palsana is well connected by roads from all the major cities of Rajasthan. One National highway NH-52 passes through center of city. NH-52 connects Sikar to Jaipur, Kaithal and Bikaner. The western freight corridor will also pass from sikar. which the main project of central government. Kotputali Kuchaman Megahighway is also passing through Palsana.

Air
The nearest airport to Palsana town is Jaipur International Airport, which operate daily flights to Delhi, Mumbai, Hyderabad, Bangalore, Pune, Indore, Ahmedabad, Chennai, Guwahati, Kolkata, Udaipur, Dubai, Sharjah, Muscat. A new airport is proposed at Shahpura (a town in Jaipur district) that is very near to Sikar. Beside that, a small Air strip at Tarpura village is also available for Small Private Planes Landing (against payment).

See also
 Sikar district
 Sikar (Lok Sabha constituency)
 Sikar (Rajasthan Assembly constituency)

References

External links
Official webpage of Sikar District
Photogallery of Sikar
Genealogy of Sikar Rulers
SURAJ Smart School

Sikar